Koprivnik v Bohinju is a settlement on the Pokljuka Plateau in the Municipality of Bohinj in the Upper Carniola region of Slovenia.

Name
The name of the settlement was changed from Koprivnik to Koprivnik v Bohinju (literally, 'Koprivnik in Bohinj') in 1955 to distinguish it from other settlements with the same name in Slovenia.

Church

The local church is dedicated to the Exaltation of the Holy Cross.

References

External links 

Koprivnik at Geopedia

Populated places in the Municipality of Bohinj